is one of the wards of the city of Nagoya in Aichi Prefecture, Japan.

Geography
Moriyama-ku is located in northeastern Nagoya. The Aichi Prefectural Forest Park covers much of its area.

Surrounding municipalities
Kita-ku, Nagoya
Higashi-ku, Nagoya
Meito-ku, Nagoya
Chikusa-ku, Nagoya
Moriyama-ku, Nagoya
Owariasahi
Nagakute
Seto
Kasugai

History 
The area around present-day Moriyama-ku has been settled since the Japanese Paleolithic period, and was a coastal area during the Holocene glacial retreat. The remains of numerous kofun burial mounds have been discovered.  By the Sengoku period, it was a contested border area of Owari province and the site of the Battle of Komaki and Nagakute.

In 1889, during the Meiji period, the area was organized into villages under Higashikasugai District, Aichi. In 1897, the area became home to the Imperial Japanese Army’s IJA 33rd Infantry Brigade under the command of the IJA 3rd Army headquartered in Nagoya. The region began to grow in population with the completion of the Japanese Government Railway’s line in 1900, and the Seto Electric Railway in 1905. Moriyama town was created on July 16, 1906, through the merger four villages, and was raised to city status on June 1, 1954. On February 15, 1963 the city was annexed by Nagoya metropolis, becoming Moriyama-ku.

Transportation

Railways
Central Japan Railway Company – Chūō Main Line

Meitetsu – Seto Line
 -  - - -
Nagoya Guideway Bus – Yutorito Line
  –  –  –  –  –

Highways
Tōmei Expressway
Japan National Route 19
Japan National Route 302
Japan National Route 155
Japan National Route 363

Education
Nagoya International School
Kinjo Gakuin University
Aichi Prefectural College of Nursing & Health

Notable people from Moriyama-ku, Nagoya 
Naomi Kawashima – actress

External links

References

Wards of Nagoya